Marc Rosset was the defending champion, but lost in the semifinals this year.

Horst Skoff won the title, defeating Sergi Bruguera 7–6(10–8), 7–6(7–4) in the final.

Seeds

  Henri Leconte (quarterfinals)
  Horst Skoff (champion)
  Jakob Hlasek (second round)
  Marc Rosset (semifinals)
  Omar Camporese (quarterfinals)
  Sergi Bruguera (final)
  Goran Prpić (first round)
  Franco Davín (second round)

Draw

Finals

Top half

Bottom half

External links
 ATP main draw

1990 Geneva Open
1990 in Swiss sport
1990 ATP Tour